Viscount  was a Japanese bureaucrat, statesman and cabinet minister, active in Meiji period Japan

Biography 

Nomura was born as the second son of a low-ranked  ashigaru samurai in Hagi,  Chōshū Domain, (currently Yamaguchi Prefecture). As a youth, he studied at Yoshida Shōin's Shokansonjuku academy, where he joined the Sonnō jōi movement against the Tokugawa shogunate and the increasing foreign presence in Japan. He participated in the unsuccessful assassination attempt against the rōjū Manabe Akikatsu and in the burning of the British legation in Edo in 1862. He fought as a member of the Chōshū  armies against the Tokugawa during the Second Chōshū expedition.

After the Meiji Restoration, he went to Tokyo and entered into service of the new Meiji government, and was selected as a member of the 1871 Iwakura Mission, visiting the United States, Great Britain and other European countries. After his return to Japan, he was appointed governor of Kanagawa Prefecture, where he was praised for his efforts in reducing government spending.
He was ennobled with the kazoku peerage title of shishaku (viscount) in 1887. In 1888, he was made a member of the Privy Council and in 1891 served as Japanese ambassador to France.

Nomura was selected to become Home Minister in the cabinet of the 2nd administration of Prime Minister Itō Hirobumi in 1894. During his tenure, the three Tama districts, formerly part of Kanagawa Prefecture, were annexed to Tokyo Prefecture. Nomura returned to the cabinet as Minister of Communications in 1896 under the 2nd Matsukata administration, during which time he attempted to stem the influence of the Mitsubishi zaibatsu, which had been strongly favored by Maejima Hisoka, over control of Japanese shipping.

Nomura died in 1909. His grave is at the Shōin Jinja, a Shinto shrine in Setagaya, Tokyo, near the grave of Yoshida Shōin.

References 
 Keene, Donald. Emperor Of Japan: Meiji And His World, 1852–1912. Columbia University Press (2005). 
 Fredrick, Louis. Japan Encyclopedia. Harvard University Press (2005). 
 Sims, Richard. Japanese Political History Since the Meiji Renovation 1868–2000. Palgrave Macmillan.

External links

Bio at National Diet Library

Notes

 
 

1842 births
1909 deaths
Samurai
People from Chōshū domain
Government ministers of Japan
Kazoku
People of Meiji-period Japan
Ministers of Home Affairs of Japan
Ambassadors of Japan to France
Governors of Kanagawa Prefecture
Members of the Iwakura Mission